The 2nd New York Infantry Regiment was an infantry regiment that served in the Union Army during the American Civil War. It is also known as the Troy Regiment.

Service
The regiment was organized in Troy, New York and was mustered in for a two-year enlistment on May 14, 1861.

The regiment was mustered out of service on May 26, 1863.

Casualties
The regiment suffered 26 deaths from wounds and 22 from other causes, for a total of 48 fatalities.

Commanders
 Colonel Joseph Bradford Carr
 Colonel Sidney Wesley Park

See also
List of New York Civil War regiments

References

External links
New York State Military Museum and Veterans Research Center - Civil War - 2nd Infantry Regiment History, photographs, table of battles and casualties, Civil War newspaper clippings, and historical sketch for the 2nd New York Infantry Regiment.

Infantry 002
1861 establishments in New York (state)
Military units and formations established in 1861
Military units and formations disestablished in 1863